The Mahindra Genio was a pickup truck manufactured by the Indian automaker Mahindra & Mahindra. It is the pickup version of the Mahindra Xylo.

On 6 January 2016, the Genio has been replaced by an updated facelifted version, known as the Mahindra Imperio.

Engine

The mHawk Diesel engine holds a capacity of 2.2-liters with 4 cylinders that delivers . The mHawk employs a top-mounted intercooler to improve turbocharger efficiency. The engine is based on the Bosch Common Rail system with solenoid injectors and fuel spray design that improves fuel efficiency. The mHawk is equipped with a two chain drive stage system and hydraulic lash adjusters.

Gallery

References

Vehicles introduced in 2014
Genio
All-wheel-drive vehicles
Rear-wheel-drive vehicles
Pickup trucks